The English Patient is a 1992 novel by Michael Ondaatje.

The English Patient may also refer to:
 The English Patient (film), a 1996 adaptation of the novel
 The English Patient (soundtrack), a soundtrack album from the film
 "The English Patient" (Seinfeld), an episode of the TV series Seinfeld